The historical form of  ("service in the Russian style") is a manner of dining with courses brought to the table sequentially, and the food portioned on individual plates by the waiter (typically from a sideboard in the dining room). It contrasts with the older  ("service in the French style") based on several courses brought to the table simultaneously, in an impressive display of tureens and serving dishes, with diners plating food themselves.

Service à la russe became the norm in formal Western cuisine over the 19th century. While it reduced the magnificent profusion of dishes and condiments on the table at a given time, it demanded many more footmen and required more tableware, making it an option only the wealthy could afford. It had the advantage of the food being much hotter when reaching the diner, and ensuring that everybody could taste everything they wanted from the dishes offered, which in practice the old system often did not allow. It also reduced the time spent at the table.

The Russian Ambassador Alexander Kurakin is credited with bringing  to France in 1810, at a meal in Clichy on the outskirts of Paris. It eventually caught on in England, becoming the norm by the 1870s and 1880s, though in France there was considerable resistance and  lingered on until the 1890s, and even beyond for the most formal state banquets.  remains the basis for most modern Western restaurant service.

Place setting and service order
 
For the most correct service à la russe, in its modern form (significantly different from the original) the following must be observed:

The place setting (called a cover) for each guest includes a service plate, all the necessary cutlery except those required for dessert, and stemmed glasses for water, wines and champagne. On the service plate are a rolled napkin and the place card. Above the plate is a saltcellar, nut dish, and a menu.

The cutlery to the right of the service plate is, from the outside in, the oyster fork resting in the bowl of the soup spoon, the fish knife, the meat knife and the salad knife (or fruit knife). On the left, from the outside in, are the fish fork, the meat fork and a salad fork (or fruit fork). If both a salad and a fruit course are served, the necessary extra flatware is brought out on a platter, as it is bad form to have more than three knives or forks on the table at once, the oyster fork excepted.

Guests are seated according to their place cards and immediately remove their napkins and place them in their laps. Another view maintains that the napkin is only removed after the host has removed his or hers. In the same manner, the host is first to begin eating, and guests follow. The oyster plate is placed on the service plate. Once that is cleared, the soup plate replaces it. After the soup course is finished, both the soup plate and service plate are removed from the table, and a heated plate is put in their place. The rule is as such: a filled plate is always replaced with an empty one, and no place goes without a plate until just before the dessert course.

The fish and meat courses are now always served from platters because in correct service a filled plate is never placed before a guest, as this would indirectly dictate how much food the guest is to eat. This was not the case historically, nor is it often followed in restaurants.

Directly before dessert, everything is removed from the place settings except the wine and water glasses. Crumbs are cleared. The dessert plate is then brought out with a doily on top of it, a finger bowl on top of that, and a fork and spoon, the former balanced on the left side of the plate and the latter on the right. Guests remove the doily and finger bowls, move them to the left of the plate and place the fork to the left side of the plate and the spoon to its right. Guests do not actually need to use the finger bowl, since they may have not used their fingers to eat with, unless they also had bread with the meal.

A multi-course dinner served à la russe
The number of dishes (or courses) served at a meal à la russe has changed over time; but an underlying pattern of service—beginning with soup, then moving through various entrées, then to the roast or game, and then to vegetables (including salads), sweets and coffee—persisted from the mid-19th century (when this type of service was introduced to France) until WWII, and continued in a much-reduced form into the 21st century. The order of dishes descends directly from the much older service à la française. In that style of service, all sorts of dishes were arranged on the table and guests served themselves and each other. As Jean-Louis Flandrin has shown, the order of consumption—known to the guests of the time but rarely evident from contemporary menus or descriptions of meals—was essentially the same as the order of presentation in service à la russe.

The most elaborate version of service à  la russe, which reached its pinnacle in the last decades of the Victorian era, was described by Sarah Tyson Rorer in 1886. Rorer was critical of this elaborate service and offered a much simpler alternative, which in fact represents the core principles of this style of service.

The elaborate and conventional dinner, complete at all points, which the dinner-giving of a century and a half has evolved, is beyond any but the very wealthy.  Very few of them succeed in giving it, and still fewer of their guests enjoy it.  Its triple triplets of oysters, soup, and fish, the relevé, entrées, and roast, a pause of rum punch to stimulate languishing digestion, game with salad, sweets and ice, coffee to close, and a bewildering series of wines, with an alcoholic appetizer to begin and end, have, however, had their effect in making many feel that a formal dinner must only follow this model from afar.  So, with only the resources of a simple household, they compass, with infinite labor, oysters, soup, and fish, add some made dish to the meat, and put salad before and ice cream after the pudding or sweets.But success here, with a moderate income, is as rare as success with the long dinner at the complete table.  Try to grasp the theory of the elaborate edifice which custom and convention has piled up, and see if your own resources cannot reproduce its purpose with better success.  After having carefully analyzed it, you will see at once that the most complex dinner simply aims to begin with something of easy digestion, slide by some transition to the roast, and make sure that through salad, sweets and coffee, the last half of your dinner shall interest the appetite as well as satisfy hunger.  You, have, therefore, soup, roast, dessert, which make up the usual dinner of thoroughly civilized people, and below you will see how, with but moderate resources, you may so vary this as to make a “little dinner” complete and satisfying in itself; more, the most elaborate meal at Delmonico’s cannot do.

In Britain and the United States, fish is a distinct course; relevés are large, solid joints of meat or whole fowl, generally baked, braised, or boiled but not roasted; entrées are elaborate "made dishes" of, typically, fillets of beef or other butcher's meat (and sometimes fowl, but—apart from days of religious observance—not fish), served in fine sauces. Roasts are solid joints of meat (and sometimes fowl) other than feathered game, usually spit-roasted but often baked. Game is feathered not furred, spit-roasted whole and served rather simply. (Rorer's "roast" here refers to a roasted entrée, but this terminology is not typical of the period. In her time, the "roast" followed the punch, and it was always game, if available.)

At the time Rorer was writing, Alessandro Filippini, a chef at Delmonico's restaurant on Pine Street in New York, wrote a book of menus for "every family of means in the habit of giving a few dinners to its friends during the year", with a brief discussion of table service and a guide to wines. He recommended the types of menus criticized by Rorer but common among the wealthy.
French dinners are generally served in three main courses, viz., Relevés, Entrées, and Rotis; all the rest are considered side courses.  It depends entirely on the taste of the host as to how many main courses he desires served.  The author would suggest two relevés, three entrées, and one or two rotis; this could be made an elaborate dinner.

About a third of Filippini's book contains menus for breakfast, luncheon, and dinner for every day of the year. The dinner menus begin with the "side courses", as he calls them: oysters or clams, soup, and hors d'œuvre; followed by the three "main courses": several relevés and entrées, and one roti (roast); and finally a few other "side courses": sweet entremets, ices, and coffee.

Hors-d'œuvre are usually small cold items (such as olives, celery, radishes, charcuterie, caviar), but they might also include hot made dishes (such as timbales, croustades, croquettes). In the French style of service à la russe, used by Filippini for many of his menus, there is no distinct "fish course", as both relevés and entrées may be of meat, fowl, or fish indiscriminately. Punch often precedes the roast. The roast can be meat, fowl, or fish (though fish is generally limited to days of religious observance); when game is served, it always comprises the roast course. Entremets are the vegetables, including salads, served with the relevés and entrées; they not as a separate course, though they are often listed as such.  Sweet entremets are cakes, puddings, and such. Ices are frozen sweets, served as a separate course. Fruit, petits fours, coffee, and cordials are offered at the end of the meal.

A few years after Filippini wrote his book, Charles Ranhofer, another chef at Delmonico's restaurant (variously at the 14th Street, 26th Street, and 44th Street locations), in his cookbook The Epicurean, outlined in great detail the dishes necessary for dinners ranging from six to fourteen courses. The six-course dinner is very much like Rorer's "little dinner": oysters, soup, fish, entrée, roast, salad, and dessert. Longer dinners are arranged by adding side dishes, removes, and various cold dishes, and by serving a greater number of entrées and desserts. The longest of these menus is as follows:
Figure 1—36 covers:
 Oysters.
 2 Soups.
 S.D. hot and cold.
 2 Fish, potatoes.
 1 Remove, vegetables.
 1 Entrée, vegetables.
 1 Entrée, vegetables.
 1 Entrée, vegetables.
 1 Punch.
 1 or 2 Roasts.
 1 or 2 Colds, salad.
 1 Hot sweet dessert.
 1 or 2 Cold sweet des'rts.
 1 or 2 Ices.  Dessert.

"S.D." are "side dishes", i.e. hors d'œuvre. There is a separate fish course, then relevés and entrées. Cold dishes, such as mayonnaise salads and aspics, had become very popular at this time, as is evident in the menu. Roasts could be of butchers' meat, fowl, or game (rarely, if ever, fish). When more than one dish was appointed for a course (e.g. 2 Soups, 2 Fish, 2 roasts, 2 colds), the guest was expected to choose one or the other, not both. A guest might decline one or more of the courses.

Ranhofer also gives elaborate instructions for the service of wine.
FIRST SERVICE.  
With Oysters.—Sauterne, Barsac, Graves, Mont Rachet, Chablis.
After the Soup.—Madeira, Sherry or Xeres.
With Fish.—(Rhine wines) Johannisberger, Marcobrunner, Hochheimer, Laubenheimer, Liebfraumilch, Steinberger. (Moselle) Brauneberger, Zeltinger, Berncasteler.
With Removes.—Côte St. Jacques, Moulin-à-vent, Macon, Clos de Vougeot, Beaune.
With Entrées.—St. Émilion, Médoc du Bordelais, St. Julien. Dry champagnes for certain countries.
Iced Punches and Sherbets, Rum, Madeira.

SECOND SERVICE.  With Roasts.—(Burgundies) Pommard, Nuits, Corton, Chambertin, Romanée Conti.
Cold Roasts.—Vin de Paille, Steinberger.
With Hot Desserts.—(Bordeaux) Château Margaux, Léoville, Laffitte, Château Larose, Pontet-Canet, St. Pierre, Côtes de Rhone, Hermitage and Côte-Rôtie. (Red Champagne) Bouzy, Verzenay, Porto Première.

THIRD SERVICE.  With Dessert.—(Burgundy) Volnay, Mousseux. (Champagnes) Delmonico, Roederer, Rosé Mousseux, Pommery, Cliquot, Perrier-Jouët, Moët, Mumm.
Wine Liquors.—Muscatel, Malaga, Alicante, Malvoisie of Madeira, Lacryma Christi, red and white Cape, Tokay, Constance, Schiraz.
Cordials.—Curaçoa [sic], Kirsch, Cognac, Chartreuse, Maraschino, Prunelle, Anisette, Bénédictine.
Beers.—Bass’ Ales, Porter, Tivoli, Milwaukee.

Several decades later, shorter meals had become the norm and the extravagant dinners of the Victorian period were considered vulgar, as noted by Emily Post in 1922: 
Under no circumstances would a private dinner, no matter how formal, consist of more than:
 Hors-d’œuvre
 Soup
 Fish
 Entrée
 Roast
 Salad
 Dessert
 Coffee
The menu for an informal dinner would leave out the entrée, and possibly either the hors-d’oeuvre or the soup.

As a matter of fact, the marked shortening of the menu is in informal dinners and at the home table of the well-to-do.  Formal dinners have been as short as the above schedule for twenty-five years.  [c.1900.] A dinner interlarded with a row of extra entrées, Roman punch, and hot dessert is unknown except at a public dinner, or in the dining-room of a parvenu.  About thirty-five years ago [c.1890] such dinners are said to have been in fashion!

At the time Post was writing, hors-d’œuvre meant rather narrowly light cold dishes like oysters, clams, melon, or citrus. Entrées meant elaborate "made dishes" of fillets of beef or other butcher's meat served in a fine sauce, or some sort of pastry dish. Roasts could be of any meat, which was not necessarily roasted. The preferred dish of a truly fine dinner was wild feathered game, spit-roasted and served rather simply. Dessert was molded ice cream only, to the exclusion of all other sweets. Despite Post's complaints about extra entrées, many dinners continued to feature two meat courses between the fish and the roast.

Post's first book was published during Prohibition, and she noted, "A water glass standing alone at each place makes such a meager and untrimmed looking table that most people put on at least two wine glasses, sherry and champagne, or claret and sherry, and pour something pinkish or yellowish into them. [...] Those few who still have cellars, serve wines exactly as they used to, white wine, claret, sherry and Burgundy warm, champagne ice cold; and after dinner, green mint poured over crushed ice in little glasses, and other liqueurs of room temperature."

After World War II, dinners were curtailed even more. As Post writes in the 1950 edition of her book, the shorter "informal" meal of her earlier book had become the norm for formal dinners:
It is rare for a modern dinner to consist of more than five courses. However, 'tasting menus' - whereby diners are served numerous courses do exist. These are the exception though, and a formal dinner today would typically include::
 Soup or oysters or melon or clams
 Fish or entrée
 Roast
 Salad
 Dessert
After-dinner coffee

In addition to the set courses, little relish dishes of radishes, celery, olives, or almonds could be set on the table as "hors-d'œuvre". Wines, too, were often greatly reduced in number. Amy Vanderbilt noted in her book, The Complete Book of Etiquette, "At a formal dinner champagne may be the only wine served after the service of sherry with the soup."

This five-course service might be further reduced by serving either soup or fish (or shellfish) as a first course, but not both.  Dinners in the French style usually include a cheese course after the roast, generally resulting in a 6-course meal (see, for example, the formal menus in Richard Olney's The French Menu Cookbook); alternatively, one or more of the other courses can be omitted (see, for example, the formal menus in Simone Beck's Simca's Cuisine). Dinners in the American style often place the salad as a first course instead of soup, an innovation that appeared in the 1950s in California and was noted by Vanderbilt; in this arrangement, dessert is served immediately after the roast.  Wine service may include a separate wine for each course, or simply be champagne throughout; or, most commonly, service may be limited to three wines: a white for the soup and fish, a red for the roast, and a sweet wine or champagne for dessert.

These and similar arrangements of four- and five-course formal dinners were the norm throughout the second half of the 20th century.

Further reading

See also

 Degustation
 Full-course dinner
 Boston Cooking-School Cook Book

References

Works cited 
  
  
 Kilien Stengel, « Découper une pièce de viande, flamber un dessert du XIXe au XXIe siècle : Art, science, privilège et obsolescence. », dans Les gestes culinaires: Mise en scène de savoir-faire, Paris, L’Harmattan, coll. Questions alimentaires et gastronomiques, 2017
 Kilien Stengel, ''Le lexique culinaire Ferrandi, Hachette, 2015, p. 190

Serving and dining